Hayward Keniston (July 5, 1883 – August 10, 1970) was a linguist who served as president of the Linguistic Society of America in 1948 and as dean of the University of Michigan College of Literature, Science and the Arts from 1945 to 1951. He received his PhD from Harvard University. His work focused predominantly on Spanish syntax and 16th century Spanish history.

References 
 
 

1883 births
1970 deaths
University of Michigan faculty
Harvard University alumni
Linguists of Spanish
Linguists from the United States
Linguistic Society of America presidents
20th-century linguists
Presidents of the Modern Language Association